Brassicoraphanus is any intergeneric hybrid between the genera Brassica (cabbages, etc.) and Raphanus (radish). The name comes from the combination of the genus names. Both diploid hybrids and allopolyploid hybrids are known and share this name.

Early experimental crosses between species of these two genera had been sterile or nearly sterile, but large-scale experiments by Soviet agronomist Georgi Dmitrievich Karpechenko using Raphanus sativus and Brassica oleracea were remarkable because some of the plants produced hundreds of seeds. The second generation were allopolyploids, the result of gametes with doubled chromosome numbers. As Karpechenko realized, this process had created a new species, and it could justifiably be called a new genus, and proposed the name Raphanobrassica for them, but the earlier name Brassicoraphanus has priority.
Plants of this parentage are now known as radicole.

Two other fertile forms of Brassicoraphanus are known by the following informal names:
 The Raparadish group are allopolyploid hybrids between Raphanus sativus and Brassica rapa, used as fodder crops
 The Radicole group are allopolyploid hybrids between Raphanus sativus and Brassica oleracea, used as fodder crops 
 Raphanofortii is the allopolyploid hybrid between Brassica tournefortii and Raphanus caudatus

Currently, it is thought that a great part of the flowering plants have some hybridization and polyploidization among their ancestors.

References

Bibliography

External links
 Observed Instances of Speciation

Brassicaceae
Brassicaceae genera
Speciation events
Soviet inventions
Russian inventions
Plant nothogenera